Bavleny is a rural locality (a selo) in Bavlenskoye Rural Settlement, Kolchuginsky District, Vladimir Oblast, Russia. The population was 2,540 as of 2010. There are 7 streets.

Geography 
Bavleny is located 21 km northeast of Kolchugino (the district's administrative centre) by road. Bavleny (settlement) is the nearest rural locality.

References 

Rural localities in Kolchuginsky District